Władysław Jędrzejewski (23 April 1935 – 11 November 2012) was a Polish boxer. He competed at the 1960 Summer Olympics and the 1964 Summer Olympics.

References

1935 births
2012 deaths
People from Zawiercie
People from Kielce Voivodeship (1919–1939)
Polish male boxers
Olympic boxers of Poland
Boxers at the 1960 Summer Olympics
Boxers at the 1964 Summer Olympics
Sportspeople from Silesian Voivodeship
Heavyweight boxers
20th-century Polish people
21st-century Polish people